Marina Masuma Ahmad is a British Labour Party politician and trade unionist who has been the London Assembly Member for Lambeth and Southwark since 2021. She represented Crystal Palace and was an education spokesperson on Bromley Council.

Early life
Ahmad was born in Bangladesh and moved to England at six months old where she grew up on a council estate. She graduated with a Bachelor of Arts in English and History from the University of Surrey.

Career 
Ahmad is a trade unionist who has worked in the public sector and is also a trained barrister. She contested Beckenham in three general elections; 2015, 2017 and 2019.

In October 2022 it was reported that Ahmad was a candidate to be the prospective parliamentary candidate in Camberwell and Peckham at the next general election. Ahmad did not make the shortlist.

Personal life
Ahmad lives in West Wickham with her husband, who is a local GP. They have two children.

Electoral history

References 

Living people
21st-century British women politicians
Alumni of the University of Surrey
Bangladeshi emigrants to England
British politicians of Bangladeshi descent
Labour Members of the London Assembly
Labour Party (UK) parliamentary candidates
Year of birth missing (living people)
Women councillors in England